Sales and operations planning (S&OP) is an integrated business management process through which the executive/leadership team continually achieves focus, alignment, and synchronization among all organization functions. The S&OP process includes an updated forecast that leads to a sales plan, production plan, inventory plan, customer lead time (backlog) plan, new product development plan, strategic initiative plan, and resulting financial plan. Plan frequency and planning horizon depend on the specifics of the context. Short product life cycles and high demand volatility require a tighter S&OP than steadily consumed products. Done well, the S&OP process also enables effective supply chain management.

The Sales and Operations planning process has a twofold scope. The first scope is the horizontal alignment to balance the supply and demand through integration between the company departments and with suppliers and customers. The second aim is the vertical alignment amid strategic plan and the operational plan of a company.

A properly implemented S&OP process routinely reviews customer demand and supply resources and "re-plans" quantitatively across an agreed rolling horizon. The re-planning process focuses on changes from the previously agreed sales and operations plan; while it helps the management team to understand how the company achieved its current level of performance, its primary focus is on future actions and anticipated results.

Definitions 
S&OP was born with the concept of aggregated production planning (APP) in the first part of 1950, then switched to manufacturing resource planning (MRP 2) around 1985, till the current definition of business process for the alignment of supply and demand. The term S&OP and its modern meaning were conceived of in the 1980s and are generally attributed to Richard Ling, then a consultant with the management consulting firm Oliver Wight. 

APICS defines S&OP as the "function of setting the overall level of manufacturing output (production plan) and other activities to best satisfy the current planned levels of sales (sales plan and/or forecasts), while meeting general business objectives of profitability, productivity, competitive customer lead times, etc., as expressed in the overall business plan." Institute for Supply Management defines it as "working cross-functionally with internal business units to forecast anticipated demand, inventory, supply and customer lead times based on the sales forecast, actual demand and capacity forecast." One of its primary purposes is to establish production rates that will achieve management’s objective of maintaining, raising, or lowering inventories or backlogs, while usually attempting to keep the workforce relatively stable. It must extend through a planning horizon sufficient to plan the labor, equipment, facilities, material, and finances required to accomplish the production plan. As this plan affects many company functions, it is normally prepared with information from marketing, manufacturing, engineering, finance, materials, etc."

It has also been described as "a set of decision-making processes to balance demand and supply, to integrate financial planning and operational planning, and to link high-level strategic plans with day-to-day operations."

Planning process 
S&OP is the result of  planning activities and it is composed of 5 main steps: data gathering, demand planning, supply planning, pre-meeting and executive meeting with the additional of a preliminary step at the beginning (event plans), two additional steps at the end of the process in case of a multinational company (global roll-up and global executive meeting) and a critical revision step as conclusive step of the S&OP cycle.

It is a tactical process with a planning horizon which covers up to 18 months, at product family level (or sku) and it is performed generally every month (or driven by events in case it is used as a tool to respond quickly to the uncertainty of the context).

It is important to note, that while S&OP is typically viewed as a balancing of supply and demand of "goods".  Patrick Bower wrote a seminal article on the use of S&OP in the service industry.

Inputs to S&OP 
The inputs are related to the plans from the different departments involved in S&OP, including constraints and goals. The inputs could be: demand plans, sales/demand forecasts, demand impacts, marketing actions and sales actions, procurement and supply plan, supplier lead time, constraints from the supplier and other information, supply capacity, production and capacity plan, Inventory, work-force level, operational constraints, production lead time, flexibility, contingencies, distribution plan and distribution capacity, lead time for the delivery, transportation status, service level targets, constraints, budgets.

Output of S&OP 
The main output from S&OP is the integration of the plans of Marketing, Sales, Operations and Finance. The integration of plans is allowed by the cross- functional integration fostered by S&OP. The integration is different from coordination: in fact, it takes in consideration the target while the coordination takes it for granted. To achieve the integration the main precursors are: informational quality (it’s important that the information for the decisions is appropriate in terms of content and in the form), procedural quality (the rules at stake are clear for all the departments involved), alignment quality (the synchronization of the goals and the actions which gives to the company a best image to the eye of the customers, suppliers, stakeholder), constructive engagement (the participants are proactive in the process and defend their interests. A high level of constructive engagement leads to greater level of S&OP effectiveness).

Goals of S&OP 
The goals of S&OP could be classified in these categories: alignment and integration, operational improvement (improvement of the operational performance, improve forecast accuracy), results focused on a single perspective (for instance, improve supply chain performance, improve customer service), results based on trade off (for example, optimize customer service versus inventory), end results (such as gross profit, contribution margins).  Many authors, including Patrick Bower have written on how S&OP creates value in the supply chain.

Implementation 
The implementation is driven by the means of maturity model of S&OP. There are different maturity models proposed in the literature in function of the type and number of dimensions (mechanisms) considered and the type and number stages of evolvement. The role of these models is three-fold: descriptive for the implementation, prescriptive (to understand which is the current state and which are the following stage to be reached), comparative (to benchmark the maturity stage of the company versus the competitors). A maturity model, suggested in the academic literature, is composed by five dimensions and five stages. The five dimensions are related to: meetings and collaboration, organization, measurement, information technology and S&OP plan integration. The stages, along with these dimensions evolved, are: no S&OP process (stage 1), reactive (stage 2), standard (stage 3), advanced (stage 4), proactive (stage 5).

There is another maturity model which suggests four dimensions and six stages of evolution. The dimensions are: process effectiveness (in terms on how the right things are doing for S&OP), process efficiency (how the things are doing right with minimum effort), people and organization and information technology. The stages of evolution are: undeveloped (level zero), rudimentary (level one), reactive (level two), consistent (level three), integrated (level four), proactive (level five).

Enablers and barriers 
In the literature are pinpointed, not just for the implementation, but also during the conducting of the process, several enablers and barriers. The main enablers are the following: the capacity to learn from previous mistakes, the ability to make changes, the discipline, the existence of an S&OP department, the top management support, the cross-functional integration, the performance evaluation, the information system, the training on S&OP, the commitment of participants, well assigned roles and responsibilities, impartiality in the conducting of the process.The main barriers indicated are: the presence of siloed culture, inadequate information technology, lack of participation or irregular attendance at meetings, difficulty to reach a joint decision during the meetings.

See also 
 Supply chain management
 CPFR
 Supply and demand
 Forecasting
 Demand chain
 Demand chain management

References

External links 

  An article outlining the different perspectives that should be considered when designing an S&OP process

A series of papers authored by Dr. Larry Lapide of the MIT Center for Transportation and Logistics:
 Sales and Operations Planning Part I: The Process
 Sales and Operations Planning Part II: Enabling Technology
 Sales and Operations Planning Part III: A Diagnostics Model

A series of practical papers authored by Robin Goodfellow and Ian Henderson of MLG Management Consultants:
 An overview of S&OP and how to make it most effective
 Executive S&OP - a series of breakfast briefings undertaken with the UK's Institute of Operations Management
 Brief article on the need for and ways to succeed with S&OP

A series of infographic images authored by Jay Sharma of SupplyChainPro Consultants:
 An Infographic of an example agenda in a S&OP Meeting
 An Infographic of a S&OP Maturity Model detailing key elements of different S&OP phases
 An Infographic of the key planning elements within S&OP and their inter-relationships
 An Infographic on key questions to address before a company implements S&OP
 An Infographic depicting key areas related to culture change for supporting S&OP

Supply chain management
Sales
Production planning